Amoria guttata is a species of sea snail, a marine gastropod mollusk in the family Volutidae, the volutes.

Description
The length of the shell varies between 37 mm and 62 mm.

Distribution
This marine species occurs off Queensland, Australia.

References

 Bail P. & Limpus A. (2001) The genus Amoria. In: G.T. Poppe & K. Groh (eds) A conchological iconography. Hackenheim: Conchbooks. 50 pp., 93 pls.

External links
 

Volutidae
Gastropods described in 1964